Jiří Hanzlík (born February 2, 1974) is a Czech professional ice hockey defenceman. He played with HC Plzeň in the Czech Extraliga during the 2010–11 season.

Hanzlík previously played for HC Bílí Tygři Liberec and HC Energie Karlovy Vary.

References

External links 
 
 

1974 births
Living people
Czech ice hockey defencemen
HC Plzeň players
People from Rokycany
HC Bílí Tygři Liberec players
HC Karlovy Vary players
Sportspeople from the Plzeň Region
Czechoslovak ice hockey defencemen